Vinny Perth (born 2 August 1976) is an Irish football manager and former player who most recently was manager of Dundalk. He was confirmed as the new manager of Dundalk in January 2019, taking over from the departed Stephen Kenny. He had been Kenny's assistant at Dundalk since 2013.

On 20 August 2020, Perth left his position as manager of Dundalk after they were eliminated from the UEFA Champions League.

On 16 June 2021, Perth returned to the club as manager, appointed with the club sat in 8th place in the table.

Managerial statistics

Honours

Player
Longford Town
FAI Cup (2): 2003, 2004
League of Ireland Cup (1): 2004

Shamrock Rovers
League of Ireland First Division (1): 2006

Manager
Dundalk
League of Ireland Premier Division (1): 2019
League of Ireland Cup (1): 2019
FAI President's Cup (1): 2019
Champions Cup (1): 2019

Individual
PFAI Manager of the Year: 2019

References

League of Ireland managers
Living people
Dundalk F.C. managers
1976 births
Republic of Ireland football managers
Malahide United F.C. managers